Hibiscus Island is a neighborhood in the city of Miami Beach on a man-made island in Biscayne Bay, Florida, United States. Hibiscus Island lies just north of Palm Island.  It is an exclusive residential neighborhood with relatively high property values.  The island is accessible via the MacArthur Causeway.

History
The dredging which created the reclaimed land on which Hibiscus Island sits was completed in 1922 by the Army Corps of Engineers, work which completed Palm and Star Island the same year. Into the 1930s, as the Great Depression diminished real estate prospects in the wake of the Florida land boom of the 1920s, The twin islands of Hibiscus and Palm Island became the winter home of such notables as Al Capone and celebrities, who were impressed by the views of the skylines of Downtown Miami and Miami Beach.

In the post-World War II economic expansion and sprawl in South Florida, Palm and Hibiscus Island became the site of the Famous Latin Quarter Nightclub in the 1940s and 1950s. Owned by Lou Walters, father of journalist Barbara Walters, the Latin Quarter was a mid-century mecca for big-named entertainers who performed for winter crowds of tourists and celebrities arriving in Miami Beach each December. Entertainers like Frank Sinatra, Dean Martin, Sammy Davis, Jr., and Tony Bennett all intermingled with waves of high-kicking chorus girls to perform three shows a night at the Latin Quarter.

The island is now home to several mansions, with converted apartments and condominiums. Home to relatively high property values in the greater Miami area, it is among the first places to evacuate in advance of a hurricane.

Education
Hibiscus Island is zoned to schools in the Miami-Dade County Public Schools.

Zoned schools include:
 South Pointe Elementary School
 Nautilus Middle School
 Miami Beach High School

External links 
Location of Hibiscus Island

References

 Florida Atlas & Gazetteer. 1989. Third ed. DeLorme Mapping. Freeport, ME.

Islands of Miami Beach, Florida
Neighborhoods in Miami Beach, Florida
Islands of Florida